The men's 4 × 100 metres relay event at the 2017 Summer Universiade was held on 27 and 28 August at the Taipei Municipal Stadium.

Medalists

Results

Heats
Qualification: The first team in each heat (Q) and the next 4 fastest (q) qualified for the final.

Final

References

Relay
2017